Theological Review is a semi-annual theological journal published by the Near East School of Theology. It was established in 1978, replacing the Near East School of Theology Quarterly, which ran from 1952 to 1974.

References

Protestant studies journals
Publications established in 1978
Biannual journals